Ahlroos is a Finnish surname. It may refer to:

Frans Ahlroos (1867-1948), Finnish typesetter, journalist, politician, member of Parliament of Finland 1907 to 1909
Kim Ahlroos (born 1971), Finnish ice hockey player
Sirpa Ahlroos-Kouko (born 1975), Finnish racing cyclist

Finnish-language surnames